Division No. 18 is a census division in Alberta, Canada. It is located in the southeast corner of northern Alberta and its largest urban community is the Town of Grande Cache. The boundaries of the division are coextensive with the outer boundaries of the Municipal District of Greenview No. 16.

Census subdivisions 
The following census subdivisions (municipalities or municipal equivalents) are located within Alberta's Division No. 18.

Towns
Fox Creek
Grande Cache
Valleyview
Municipal districts
Greenview No. 16, M.D. of
Indian reserves
Sturgeon Lake 154
Sturgeon Lake 154A

Demographics 

See also 
List of census divisions of Alberta
List of communities in Alberta

References 

Census divisions of Alberta
Peace River Country